Isopropyl myristate (IPM) is the ester of isopropyl alcohol and myristic acid.

Uses
Isopropyl myristate is a polar emollient and is used in cosmetic and topical pharmaceutical preparations where skin absorption is desired. It is also used as a treatment for head lice. It is also  in flea and tick killing products for pets.

It is used to remove bacteria from the oral cavity as the non-aqueous component of the two-phase mouthwash product "Dentyl pH".

Isopropyl myristate is also used as a solvent in perfume materials, and in the removal process of prosthetic make-up.

Hydrolysis of the ester from isopropyl myristate can liberate the acid and the alcohol. The acid is theorized to be responsible for decreasing of the pH value of formulations.

References

External links
 

Carboxylate esters
Cosmetics chemicals
Isopropyl esters